Chromadoridae is a family of nematodes belonging to the order Desmodorida.

Genera
Genera:
 Acantholaimus Allgén, 1933
 Actinonema Cobb, 1920
 Algoanema Heyns & Furstenberg, 1987
 Atrochromadora Wieser, 1959
 Chromadora Bastian, 1865
 Chromadorella Filipjev, 1918
 Chromadorina Filipjev, 1918
 Chromadorissa Filipjev, 1917
 Chromadorita Filipjev, 1922
 Chromanema Khera, 1975
 Chromasora
 Crestanema Pastor de Ward, 1985
 Dasylaimus Cobb, 1933
 Deltanema Kreis, 1929
 Denticulella Cobb, 1933
 Dichromadora Kreis, 1929
 Dicriconema Steiner & Hoeppli, 1926
 Endeolophos Boucher, 1976
 Euchromadora de Man, 1886
 Euchromanema Kulikov & Dashchenko, 1991
 Graphonema Cobb, 1898
 Harpagonchoides Platonova & Potin, 1972
 Harpagonchus Platonova & Potin, 1972
 Hypodontolaimus de Man, 1886
 Innocuonema Inglis, 1969
 Karkinochromadora Blome, 1982
 Macrochromadora Kreis, 1929
 Megadontolaimus Timm, 1969
 Neochromadora Micoletzky, 1924
 Nygmatonchus Cobb, 1933
 Odontocricus Steiner, 1918
 Panduripharynx Timm, 1961
 Parachromadorita Blome, 1974
 Paradichromadora Dashchenko, 1991
 Parapinnanema Inglis, 1969
 Portmacquaria Blome, 2005
 Prochromadora Filipjev, 1922
 Prochromadorella Micoletzky, 1924
 Ptycholaimellus Cobb, 1920
 Punctodora Filipjev, 1928
 Rhabdotoderma Marion, 1870
 Rhips Cobb, 1920
 Spiliphera Bastian, 1865
 Spilophorella Filipjev, 1917
 Steineridora Inglis, 1969
 Timmia Hopper, 1961
 Trichomadora
 Trichomadorita Timm, 1961
 Trichromadora Kreis, 1929
 Trichromadorita Timm, 1961
 Tridentellia Gerlach & Riemann, 1973
 Trochamus Boucher & De Bovée, 1971

References

Nematodes